Cussonia sphaerocephala is a species of tree in the family Araliaceae. It is known as the Natal forest cabbage tree; in Afrikaans it is called the Natalse boskiepersol, and in isiZulu as umsenge.

Description
The distinctive leaves are twice compound arranged in neat circular heads.

Habitat
It grows on the subtropical coast of South Africa.

Ecology
The larva of the cabbage tree emperor moth (Bunaea alcinoe) feed on the leaves.

References

Araliaceae
Trees of South Africa